The eighth Cuban National Series was won by Azucareros, with defending champion Habana and four-time champion Industriales hot on the trail of the cane cutters. For the first time in several seasons, the number of teams and games remained unchanged from the previous season.

Standings

References

 (Note - text is printed in a white font on a white background, depending on browser used.)

Cuban National Series seasons
Cuban National Series
1968 in Cuban sport
1969 in Cuban sport